Çağrı Şensoy (born 17 April 1986) is a Turkish actor known for his roles as 'Deli Hüseyin Pasha' in Muhteşem Yüzyıl: Kösem, as 'Cerkutay' in Kuruluş: Osman and as 'Kürşat Teğmen' in Savaşçı.

Biography 
Şensoy was born on 17 April 1986 in Istanbul. He completed his high school education in Pera Fine Arts High School where he studied theater between 2000-2004, then he completed his higher education at Istanbul University State Conservatory Acting Department and continued his graduate education at Kadir Has University Film and Drama Department.

Between 2002 and 2012, he also appeared in many theatre plays and later appeared in many popular TV series including Muhteşem Yüzyıl: Kösem, where he played the role of 'Deli Hüseyin Paşa' and in Kuruluş: Osman, where he appeared as 'Cerkutay' one of the most loved characters in 'Kurulus: Osman'.

Filmography

References

External links

1986 births
Living people
Turkish male television actors
21st-century Turkish male actors
Istanbul University alumni
Kadir Has University alumni
Male actors from Istanbul